Root is a municipality in the district of Lucerne in the canton of Lucerne in Switzerland.

Geography

Of this area, 50.9% is used for agricultural purposes, while 27.8% is forested. Of the rest of the land, 17% is settled (buildings or roads) and the remainder (4.3%) is non-productive (rivers, glaciers or mountains). , 27.86% of the total land area was forested. Of the agricultural land, 47.51% is used for farming or pastures, while 3.58% is used for orchards or vine crops. Of the settled areas, 6.71% is covered with buildings, 4.97% is industrial, 0.81% is classed as special developments, 1.27% is parks or greenbelts and 2.89% is transportation infrastructure. Of the unproductive areas,  3.7% is unproductive flowing water (rivers) and 0.69% is other unproductive land.

Demographics
Root has a population of 5,125, of which 26.5% are foreign nationals.  Over the last 10 years the population has grown at a rate of 14.5%.  Most of the population speaks German  (85.6%), with Serbo-Croatian being second most common ( 4.2%) and Albanian being third ( 3.8%).

In the 2007 election the most popular party was the SVP which received 36% of the vote.  The next three most popular parties were the CVP (33.5%), the FDP (14%) and the SPS (9.1%).

The age distribution in Root is; 1,058 people or 25.1% of the population is 0–19 years old.  1,281 people or 30.4% are 20–39 years old, and 1,386 people or 32.9% are 40–64 years old.  The senior population distribution is 355 people or 8.4% are 65–79 years old, 115 or 2.7% are 80–89 years old and 16 people or 0.4% of the population are 90+ years old.

In Root about 66% of the population (between age 25–64) have completed either non-mandatory upper secondary education or additional higher education (either university or a Fachhochschule).

 there are 1,432 households, of which 427 households (or about 29.8%) contain only a single individual.  138 or about 9.6% are large households, with at least five members.   there were 504 inhabited buildings in the municipality, of which 381 were built only as housing, and 123 were mixed use buildings.  There were 211 single family homes, 34 double family homes, and 136 multi-family homes in the municipality.  Most homes were either two (147) or three (150) story structures.  There were only 3 single story buildings and 81 four or more story buildings.

Root has an unemployment rate of 2.36%.  , there were 91 people employed in the primary economic sector and about 31 businesses involved in this sector.  1250 people are employed in the secondary sector and there are 66 businesses in this sector.  973 people are employed in the tertiary sector, with 141 businesses in this sector.   53.8% of the population of the municipality were employed in some capacity.  At the same time, females made up 41.6% of the workforce.

 the religious membership of Root was; 2,435 (67.2%) were Roman Catholic, and 335 (9.2%) were Protestant, with an additional 85 (2.34%) that were of some other Christian faith.   There are 450 individuals (12.41% of the population) who are Muslim.  Of the rest; there were 22 (0.61%) individuals who belong to another religion, 190 (5.24%) who do not belong to any organized religion, 108 (2.98%) who did not answer the question.

References

Municipalities of the canton of Lucerne